Stephen's Vale Nature Reserve is located in a small wooded valley south of Greyfield Wood and west of High Littleton in Somerset, England. It is known for its two-stage, 15 foot high waterfall, which is on a tributary of Cam Brook.

History 
Stephen's Vale Nature Reserve was once part of the Earl of Warwick's hunting estate.

In popular culture 
The waterfall at Stephen's Vale Nature Reserve, and the nearby Greyfield Wood were used as locations for filming the British television series Robin of Sherwood.

References

Waterfalls of England
Landforms of Somerset